Pilgrim (sometimes later titled as Inferno) is a 2000 film directed by Harley Cokeliss and written by Peter Milligan. It stars Ray Liotta as an amnesiac.

Plot
Jack (Ray Liotta) awakes with amnesia in the middle of the desert. Suffering from violent flashbacks, he finds his way to the home of reclusive artist Vicky Robinson (Gloria Reuben), who agrees to help him uncover his past. While Jack's flashbacks become more violent and vivid, the pieces of his past slowly come together. He remembers having a large sum of money, which is now missing. As his apparent associates catch up with him demanding to know the whereabouts of the stash, Jack realizes that they are not only after the money, but his life.

External links
 
 

2000 films
2000 thriller films
Films scored by Fred Mollin
Films about amnesia
Films directed by Harley Cokeliss
Works by Peter Milligan
2000s English-language films